Presentative may refer to:

 In philosophy and psychology, capable of being directly perceived and represented by the mind
 More specifically, represented in the mind as conceived in presentationism
 Presentative (linguistics), a word or construction that introduces a new referent and draws the attention towards it 
 In ecclesiastical law, having the right of presentation

See also 
 Presentational (disambiguation)
 Representative (disambiguation)